Abbot of Battle was the title given to the abbot of Battle Abbey in Sussex, England. The abbey was founded in 1067 by William the Conqueror and the first abbot was Robert Blanchard, who drowned soon after his appointment. The following table gives the abbots from the founding of the abbey until 1216, and is from Heads of Religious Houses: England and Wales 940–1216.

References

 
Order of Saint Benedict
Lists of abbots
Abbot of Battle